The Oklahoma Department of Central Services (DCS) was an agency of the government of Oklahoma which was dissolved in 2011. DCS was responsible for providing services to help manage and support the basic functioning of all state agencies. DCS provides government-wide purchasing, supplying, operation, and maintenance of state property, buildings, and equipment, and for the sale of surplus items. DCS also manages the state motor vehicle fleet and provides government-wide risk management, printing and distribution, and strategic financial and administrative support.

The Department was created in 1992 during the term of Governor David Walters and then consolidated into the Office of State Finance in 2011 under Governor Mary Fallin.

Divisions
DCS is organized into seven functional divisions:
Central Purchasing Division
Office of Facilities Management
Construction and Properties Division
Fleet Management Division
Risk Management Division
Property Reutilization Division
Central Printing and Interagency Mail Division

Facilities
The Central Services Department's Facilities Services Division, formerly the Building Management Division, is responsible for operating and maintain seventeen buildings, including the Oklahoma State Capitol and the Oklahoma Governor's Mansion. In total, the Division manages approximately two million square feet.

The following is a list of facilities within the State Capitol Complex under the control of the Division and the agencies they house:
Oklahoma Governor's Mansion - 820 N.E. 23rd St
Governor of Oklahoma
Oklahoma State Capitol - 2300 N. Lincoln
Governor of Oklahoma
Lieutenant Governor of Oklahoma
Oklahoma House of Representatives
Oklahoma Senate
Oklahoma Supreme Court
Oklahoma Court of Criminal Appeals
Oklahoma State Treasurer
Oklahoma Secretary of State
Oklahoma State Auditor and Inspector
Oklahoma Office of State Finance
Oklahoma Ethics Commission
Oklahoma State Election Board
Denver Davison Court Building - 1915 N. Stiles
Oklahoma Workers Compensation Court
Neal A. McCaleb Building - 200 N.E. 21st
Oklahoma Department of Transportation
Jim Thorpe Building - 2101 N. Lincoln
Oklahoma Office of Personnel Management
Oklahoma Corporation Commission
Department of Agriculture Building - 2800 N. Lincoln
Oklahoma Department of Agriculture, Food, and Forestry
Oklahoma Conservation Commission
State Banking Department Building - 2900 N. Lincoln
Oklahoma State Banking Department
M. C. Connors Building - 2501 N. 25th
Oklahoma Tax Commission
Oliver Hodge Education Building - 2500 N 25th
Oklahoma State Department of Education
Sequoyah Building - 2400 N. 24th
Oklahoma Department of Human Services
Will Rogers Building - 2401 N. 24th
Oklahoma Employment Security Commission
Oklahoma Department of Central Services
Oklahoma Department of Emergency Management
Attorney General Building - 313 N.E. 21st
Oklahoma Attorney General

The following is a list of major state facilities not under the control of the Division and the agencies they house:
Department of Public Safety Building - 3600 N. Martin Luther King
Oklahoma Department of Public Safety
Department of Corrections Building - 3400 N. Martin Luther King
Oklahoma Department of Corrections
Department of Health Building - 120 N. Robinson
Oklahoma State Department of Health
Oklahoma Department of Tourism and Recreation
Department of Commerce Building - 900 N. Stiles
Oklahoma Department of Commerce
Department of Mental Health Building - 1200 NE. 13th
Oklahoma Department of Mental Health and Substance Abuse Services
Lincoln Plaza Office Complex - 4545 N. Lincoln
Oklahoma Health Care Authority
Oklahoma Department of Consumer Credit
Department of Environmental Quality Building - 707 N. Robinson
Oklahoma Department of Environmental Quality

Staffing
The Central Services Department, with an annual budget of over $60 million, is one of the larger employers of the State. For fiscal year 2011, the Department was authorized 248 full-time employees.

Supporting agencies
State Capitol Preservation Commission
Oklahoma Capitol Improvement Authority
Capitol-Medical Center Improvement and Zoning Commission
State Use Program
Public Employees Relations Board

References

See also
General Services Administration

Central Services, Department of